Nikita Porshnev (born 5 March 1996) is a Russian biathlete.

He competed at the Biathlon World Championships 2019, winning a medal.

Biathlon results
All results are sourced from the International Biathlon Union.

World Championships
1 medal (1 bronze)

*During Olympic seasons competitions are only held for those events not included in the Olympic program.
**The single mixed relay was added as an event in 2019.

References

External links

1996 births
Living people
Russian male biathletes
Sportspeople from Saratov
Biathlon World Championships medalists
Universiade medalists in biathlon
Universiade gold medalists for Russia
Universiade silver medalists for Russia
Universiade bronze medalists for Russia
Competitors at the 2019 Winter Universiade
20th-century Russian people
21st-century Russian people